The Laughing Mask may refer to:

 Laughing Mask, a Marvel Comics character
 The Laughing Mask (film), a 2014 independent horror film